The name Debra has been used for three tropical cyclones in the Atlantic Ocean.

Hurricane Debra (1959), a weak Category 1 hurricane that made its landfall in Texas
Hurricane Debra (1963), a Category 1 hurricane that never affected land
Tropical Storm Debra (1978), a short-lived tropical storm that caused minimal damages in Louisiana

Atlantic hurricane set index articles